From late spring to late summer heat waves in 2022 smashed many records in North America between May and September of that year. Dozens of temperature records were surpassed in the United States.

May 
The first round of intense heat came on May 13, when Caribou, Maine hit , the second earliest on record. The next day, three people who lived inside of a senior building passed away in Chicago, Illinois as a result of the heat, due to the air conditioning malfunctioning. This heat persisted into May 22, when Dulles International Airport hit , breaking the daily high record, and Westfield, Massachusetts hit . Very brief intense heat returned on May 31, as much of the New York Metropolitan Area set record highs that day. Toronto also recorded a record high of  that day. Further south, schools released kids early that day due to the heat, with highs forecast in the upper 90s Fahrenheit. However, by June 1, a backdoor cold front reduced temperatures dramatically.

June  
A historic heat wave affected the Midwestern United States and Southeastern United States in the second week of June 2022. In Phoenix, a daily record was tied, as the mercury soared up to 114 °F (45.6 °C). This forced over 125 million people under excessive heat warnings. In San Antonio, every day in June 2022 was at least as hot as 97 °F (36 °C), except for June 28. On June 13, St. Louis hit 100 °F (37.8 °C), breaking the daily record. In addition, from the 13–16, the morning low never went below 81 °F (27.2 °C), breaking the warmest morning low record for the next 4 days. In Chicago, Midway Airport recorded three days with high temperatures of at least  between June 14 and 21. This was the first time Minneapolis saw triple digits in four years. Heat in Alaska triggered 31 wildfires.

July 
An intense, fatal heat wave swept through the United States in July. More than 100 million people were put on heat alerts, and over 85% of the country had temperatures at or above . This extreme heat severely intensifies drought conditions. Arkansas and Missouri went from 1% and 2% of their states from seeing severe drought or worse, to a quarter and a third. Temperatures in Abilene, Texas on July 20 hit , breaking a daily record. Daily record high low temperature records were set, like in Needles, California, where the temperature never dipped below  on July 20. Record warm low temperatures were also set in Galveston, Witchita Falls, Houston and Laredo, on July 20. The heat wave was responsible for 18 other deaths, including 12 in Maricopa County, Arizona and one at Badlands National Park. Witchita Falls hit  on July 20, a record for July, while on that day Oklahoma also reached that mark. When the heat wave broke on July 25, multiple flash flood warnings were issued with the cold front. Also, in New York City, for only the 3rd time, the entire month had highs above .

Later on in the month, another heat wave in Portland, Oregon causes 14 additional deaths. Portland saw 7 consecutive days at or above , while Seattle saw six days at or above , both breaking records for duration, by July 31.

August 
Intense heat continued into August. In early August, a heat wave forced 80 million Americans under heat alerts. This led to a ten day long heat wave in Philadelphia, while Boston saw temperatures above  for six days in a row. Due to this, the New York Metropolitan Area had a top 5 hottest August, and Islip, New York and Newark, New Jersey had their warmest on record, and so did Philadelphia a little bit to the southwest. Further west, Missoula, Montana saw their hottest August on record, while Portland, Oregon recorded their warmest ever month. August, like July, was the warmest for daily minimums. Oregon, Washington, Idaho, New Jersey, Connecticut, Rhode Island, Massachusetts and New Hampshire had their warmest August on record. In addition, Newark set a record for the most days above  in August.

September 
On September 1, Death Valley hits , a global record for September. California's power grid nearly broke. There were two deaths – one each in Arizona and Idaho. Later on in the month, Nashville set their latest day at or above  on September 21. Nevada and Utah saw their hottest September on record, and the 3rd quarter of 2022 for the United States as a whole was the hottest on record. September 2022 became the hottest on record for the continent of North America at large.

See also 
Weather of 2022
2020–22 North American drought

References 

2022 in the United States
2022 meteorology
2022 heat waves